Piancogno is a commune in the Italian province of Brescia, in Lombardy.

References

Cities and towns in Lombardy